Jayden Sawyer (born 26 September 1993) is an Australian para athlete who competes mainly in the F38 category in throwing events. He won has won gold and bronze medals at the World Para Athletics Championships. He competed at the 2016 Rio and 2020 Tokyo Summer Paralympics.

Personal 
Sawyer was born on 26 September 1993 and has cerebral palsy. He attended Gold Creek School, Canberra. Sawyer was originally coached by Chris Timson and resides in Canberra, Australian Capital Territory. He holds a Certificate III in Hospitality.

Sporting career 

In 2011, Sawyer competed in the Australian Athletics Championships where he won a gold and bronze in javelin and shot put. Sawyer competed in the men's javelin events and shot put in the 2012 Australian Athletics Championships in Melbourne he won gold  and came 4th respectively. 
At the 2013 Australian Athletics Championships, in Sydney, Sawyer won gold in the men's ambulant javelin throw event.

Sawyer qualified for the F37/38 javelin throw and F38 shot put 2013 IPC Athletics World Championships in Lyon, where he won bronze and came sixth respectively.

Sawyer won gold in the men's ambulant javelin throw at the 2014 Australian Athletics  Championships in Melbourne by throwing the javelin 42.58m. In Brisbane at the 2015 Australian Athletics Championships Sawyer won gold in the T/F38 men's ambulant javelin.

At the 2015 IPC Athletics World Championships in Doha, he finished fourth in the Men's Javelin F38 with a personal best throw of personal best of 45.78m. .

At the 2016 Rio Paralympics, Sawyer finished fifth in the Men's Javelin F38 with a throw of 45.63.

Sawyer won the gold medal in the Men's Javelin F38 with a world record throw of 52.96m  at the 2017 World Para Athletics Championships in London, England. The throw was a personal best by 4.5m. 

At the 2019 World Para Athletics Championships in Dubai, he came fifth in the Men's Javelin F38. 

Sawyer then competed at the 2020 Tokyo Paralympics, coming 7th in the Javelin F38.

He is coached by Mike Barber.

Recognition 
In 2008 Sawyer was awarded the Most Outstanding Junior Athlete with a Disability by North Canberra Gungahlin Athletics.

Between 2013 and 2014 Sawyer was  given a dAIS athlete grant by the Australian Institute of Sport. In 2014 and 2015 Sawyer was a given a further dAIS athlete grant by the Australian Institute of Sport.

Sawyer was nominated by ACT Athletics for the 2013/14 Outstanding athlete track and field in the open male Athlete with a Disability category. In addition he was nominated for the Mick Dowling Trophy Outstanding Athlete with a Disability and for the Global Award Athlete of the Year.

He was a Laurel Wreath recipient at Athletics ACT for the 2013/14 season.
In December 2017, Sawyer was awarded the Canberra Sport Awards Para Athlete of the Year.

References

External links
 
 
 Jayden Sawyer at Australian Athletics Historical Results

Track and field athletes with cerebral palsy
Cerebral Palsy category Paralympic competitors
Paralympic athletes of Australia
Athletes (track and field) at the 2016 Summer Paralympics
Athletes (track and field) at the 2020 Summer Paralympics
World record holders in Paralympic athletics
1993 births
Living people
Australian male javelin throwers